Engin Özdemir (born 1 October 1968) is a Turkish former professional footballer who played as a right midfielder and winger. He is best known for playing for Gençlerbirliği. He is also the father of Youtuber CaniSports.

Career

Club 
Özdemir started playing for SV 07 Raunheim at the age of 10, before joining Mainz 05, who at the time were playing in the Oberliga Südwest, 9 years later. During his two year stay, he played 23 matches in all competitions, scoring 11 and getting 1 assist and helped Mainz gain promotion to the 2. Bundesliga for the 1988–89 season.

He then joined Türkgücü München, who were playing in the Landesliga Bayern-Süd. Before leaving in November 1992, Özdemir playing 12 games, scoring 11 times in the 1992–93 season.

Özdemir made 4 appearances at the 1995 UEFA Intertoto Cup, scoring 5 goals. However, Gençlerbirliği finished third in their group and so failed to progress. With İstanbulspor, he played 6 times and scored 1 goal at the 1997 Intertoto Cup.

International career 

Özdemir made his international debut for Turkey on 9 April 1996 in a friendly against Azerbaijan, in which Turkey won 1–0. He played again in a subsequent friendly on 1 May against Ukraine, where Turkey won 3–2.

Coaching 
Özdemir was player-coach of SV Dersim  Ruesselsheim from July 2009 until December 2009. From 2010 until December 2012, he was a player-coach for FV Biebrich.

From 2013 until 2014, he was the youth team coach for TSG 1846 Mainz-Kastel. Özdemir was the head coach of the Yeni Malatyaspor youth team from October 2015 until August 2016, where he was made assistant manager of the senior team until May 2017. He was the assistant coach of Eskişehirspor from August 2018 until May 2019. In January 2021, he became the manager of  Çatalcaspor, who are in the TFF 3. Lig.

Career statistics

Club

International

Footnotes

References 

1968 births
Living people
People from Sivas
Turkish footballers
Turkey international footballers
Adanaspor footballers
İstanbulspor footballers
Gençlerbirliği S.K. footballers
Diyarbakırspor footballers
Antalyaspor footballers
Association football wingers